Lorenzo Simonelli may refer to:

 Lorenzo Simonelli (manager) (born 1973), Italian manager
 Lorenzo Simonelli (athlete) (born 2002), Italian athlete